Anupam Toppo is an Indian cricketer. He made his first-class debut for Chhattisgarh in the 2016–17 Ranji Trophy on 13 November 2016.

References

External links
 

Year of birth missing (living people)
Living people
Indian cricketers
Chhattisgarh cricketers
Place of birth missing (living people)